21 and a Wake-Up is a 2009 American war film directed and written by producer, director, and writer Chris McIntyre and starring Amy Acker, Danica McKellar, and Faye Dunaway.

The first American film about the Vietnam War allowed to shoot on location in Vietnam after the Vietnam War, it is based on a dozen true stories, most surrounding the final days of the 24th Evacuation Hospital, the last major Army hospital in the south to close as Americans abandoned Southeast Asia. 21 and a Wakeup has an all-star cast, and was written and directed by Chris McIntyre, a veteran of the US Marine Corps from 1967 through 1971, the most conflicted years of the war. The film focuses on real people McIntyre knew in the Marines, as well as experiences of Dr. Marvin Wayne, renowned and decorated physician at the 24th Evac in its final year. 21 and a Wakeup has been described as "an action packed drama that genuinely gets under the skin of its characters, showcasing the breathtaking beauty of Vietnam that most Americans have never seen."

Premise
The film is based on real events, focusing on the lives of three young nurses, one of whom undertakes a treacherous journey up the Mekong River to Cambodia to save a very young Vietnamese-American girl before her life is destroyed during the American bombing of Cambodia.

External links
 
 
 

2009 films
2000s war drama films
American films based on actual events
American war drama films
Films set in the 1960s
Films set in the 1970s
Films shot in Vietnam
Medical-themed films
Vietnam War films
War films based on actual events
2009 drama films
2000s English-language films
2000s American films